is a subway station on the Tokyo Metro Marunouchi Line in Suginami, Tokyo, Japan, operated by the Tokyo subway operator Tokyo Metro.

Lines
It is numbered "Mb-03".

Station layout
The station consists of a single underground island platform on the second basement level, serving two tracks.

There are two entrances to the station: Entrance 1 provides access to the west (terminating) end of the platforms via a concourse on the same second basement level, while Entrance 2 provides access to the east end of the platforms via a concourse on the first basement level. Toilet facilities are available on the Entrance 1 concourse.

Platforms

History
Honancho Station opened on 23 March 1962. 

The station facilities were inherited by Tokyo Metro after the privatization of the Teito Rapid Transit Authority (TRTA) in 2004.

Construction work started in 2013 to extend the platform-edge doors along the platforms to handle six-car trains, allowing through-running services to and from Ikebukuro via the main Marunouchi Line from fiscal 2017.

Passenger statistics
In fiscal 2013, the station was the hundredth-busiest on the Tokyo Metro network with an average of 33,335 passengers daily.

The passenger statistics for previous years are as shown below.

Surrounding area
 Kanda River

Exit 1 (west end)
 Izumi Health Center
 Sennan Junior High School

Exit 2 (east end)
 Nakano Special Needs Education School
 Minami-Nakano Junior High School
 Honan Elementary School

See also
 List of railway stations in Japan

References

External links

 Tokyo Metro station information 

Stations of Tokyo Metro
Tokyo Metro Marunouchi Line
Railway stations in Tokyo
Railway stations in Japan opened in 1962